Strahinja Gavrilović (born 5 April 1993) is a Serbian professional basketball player for Mladost Zemun of the Adriatic League and the Basketball League of Serbia (KLS).

Professional career
After going undrafted in the 2016 NBA draft, Gavrilović signed a contract with the Serbian club Dynamic Belgrade. He spent one season with them and averaged 9.9 points per game in Basketball League of Serbia.

On August 15, 2017, Gavrilović signed a contract with Partizan. In 2017–18 season, he player 18 ABA League games and averaged 5.7 points and 2.6 rebounds, while shooting 58.2% from the field goal.

On December 25, 2018, he parted ways with Partizan. Two days later he signed a contract with Borac Čačak.

Gavrilović sent the 2020-21 season with Real Murcia of the Spanish LEB Oro. He averaged 9.0 points and 3.6 rebounds per game. On August 30, 2021, Gavrilović signed with Mladost Zemun of the Adriatic League and the Basketball League of Serbia.

Career achievements and awards 
 Serbian Cup winner: 1 (with Partizan NIS: 2017–18)

References

External links
 Strahinja Gavrilović USC Trojans Profile
 Strahinja Gavrilović at aba-liga.com
 Strahinja Gavrilović at eurobasket.com
 Strahinja Gavrilović at espn.com

1993 births
Living people
ABA League players
Basketball League of Serbia players
CB Breogán players
KK Borac Čačak players
KK Dynamic players
KK Mladost Zemun players
KK Partizan players
Power forwards (basketball)
Serbian expatriate basketball people in Spain
Serbian expatriate basketball people in the United States
Serbian men's basketball players
Sportspeople from Kragujevac
USC Trojans men's basketball players